Série 9100 were a class of metre gauge diesel railcars built for use by the Portuguese Railways (CP) on the Tâmega line. Only three were built; they were constructed in Sweden by NOHAB in 1949. They were essentially a narrow gauge version of CP's larger Série 0100 railcars.

They were withdrawn from service in 2002 and replaced by Série 9500 railcars.

The Tâmega line closed in 2009.

See also
Narrow gauge railways in Portugal

Diesel multiple units of Portugal